Grindelia arizonica, the Arizona gumweed, is a North American species of flowering plants in the family Asteraceae. It is native to the southwestern United States and northern Mexico, in the States of Coahuila, Chihuahua, Arizona, New Mexico, Utah, Texas, and Colorado.

Grindelia arizonica grows in prairies and thickets, and along streambanks. The plant usually produces numerous flower heads in open, branching arrays. Each head has 8-26 ray flowers, although some individuals have no rays. In the center of the head, there are a large number of tiny disc flowers.

References

External links
Southwest Colorado Wildflowers photos
Vascular Plants of the Gila Wilderness

arizonica
Flora of the Southwestern United States
Flora of Northeastern Mexico
Flora of New Mexico
Plants described in 1881